Claudia Rivero Modenesi (born 28 November 1986 in Lima) is a Peruvian badminton player. She won the bronze medal in the singles and mixed doubles category at the 2007 and the 2011 Pan American Games. Rivero represented her country at the 2008 and the 2012 Olympic Games. She was the champion in the women's singles and doubles at the 2008 Pan Am Badminton Championships in Lima, Peru.

Achievements

Pan American Games
Women's singles

Mixed doubles

Pan Am Championships
Women's singles

Women's doubles

South American Games
Women's singles

Women's doubles

Mixed doubles

Pan Am Junior Championships
Girls' singles

Girls' doubles

BWF International Challenge/Series
Women's singles

Women's doubles

Mixed doubles

 BWF International Challenge tournament
 BWF International Series tournament
 BWF Future Series tournament

References

External links
  (archive)
 
 
 

Peruvian female badminton players
Living people
1986 births
Sportspeople from Lima
Badminton players at the 2008 Summer Olympics
Badminton players at the 2012 Summer Olympics
Olympic badminton players of Peru
Badminton players at the 2007 Pan American Games
Badminton players at the 2011 Pan American Games
Pan American Games bronze medalists for Peru
Pan American Games medalists in badminton
South American Games gold medalists for Peru
South American Games silver medalists for Peru
South American Games medalists in badminton
Competitors at the 2010 South American Games
Medalists at the 2007 Pan American Games
Medalists at the 2011 Pan American Games
21st-century Peruvian women